Calocoris texanus is a species of true bug in the family Miridae. It lives in the Nearctic and is part of the Calocoris genus.

References

Mirini